Shelburne is a town in Coös County, New Hampshire, United States. The population was 353 at the 2020 census. It is located in the White Mountains, and part of the White Mountain National Forest is in the south. Shelburne is home to Leadmine State Forest. The Appalachian Trail crosses the town.

Shelburne is part of the Berlin, NH–VT Micropolitan Statistical Area.

History

First granted in 1769 by Governor John Wentworth, the town was named for William Petty Fitzmaurice, Earl of Shelburne. He was a supporter of independence for the American colonies, and at his insistence, King George III recognized the independence of the United States. The town was first settled in 1771, and incorporated on December 13, 1820, when Shelburne voters chose to keep the name. It included "Shelburne Addition", that was set off and incorporated in 1836 as Gorham.

On August 3, 1781, the town was attacked by a party of six Indians, who had earlier raided Bethel and Gilead, Maine. They killed one man and took another into captivity. The rest of the inhabitants fled to Hark Hill, where they spent the night before sheltering in Fryeburg.

Shelburne provided excellent soil for farming on either side of the Androscoggin River, but not far from the stream it becomes mountainous. The Atlantic and St. Lawrence Railroad, which opened to Gorham on July 23, 1851, and later became the Grand Trunk Railway, passed through the southern part of the town. In 1859, the population was 480.

Located at the northern end of the Mount Washington Valley, Shelburne has a beautiful grove of birch trees, popular with artists and photographers, dedicated to the town's soldiers who served in World War II.

Geography
Shelburne is drained by the Androscoggin River. Part of the Mahoosuc Range is in the north, while the northern end of the Carter-Moriah Range is to the south.

The town is crossed by U.S. Route 2.

Demographics

As of the census of 2000, there were 379 people, 156 households, and 114 families living in the town.  The population density was 7.9 people per square mile (3.1/km).  There were 197 housing units at an average density of 4.1 per square mile (1.6/km).  The racial makeup of the town was 97.36% White, 0.26% Native American, 0.26% Asian, 0.26% from other races, and 1.85% from two or more races. Hispanic or Latino of any race were 1.06% of the population.

There were 156 households, out of which 31.4% had children under the age of 18 living with them, 67.9% were married couples living together, 2.6% had a female householder with no husband present, and 26.9% were non-families. 20.5% of all households were made up of individuals, and 6.4% had someone living alone who was 65 years of age or older.  The average household size was 2.43 and the average family size was 2.85.

In the town, the population was spread out, with 23.5% under the age of 18, 4.5% from 18 to 24, 21.4% from 25 to 44, 34.3% from 45 to 64, and 16.4% who were 65 years of age or older.  The median age was 45 years. For every 100 females, there were 106.0 males.  For every 100 females age 18 and over, there were 107.1 males.

The median income for a household in the town was $44,375, and the median income for a family was $59,375. Males had a median income of $36,000 versus $22,188 for females. The per capita income for the town was $24,899.  About 2.9% of families and 3.7% of the population were below the poverty line, including none of those under age 18 and 13.5% of those age 65 or over.

Notable people
 Matt Bevin (born 1967), businessperson, governor of Kentucky (R; 2015–2019)
 John N. Philbrook (1840–1923), Maine legislator
 Anne Whitney (1821–1915), American sculptor, poet

See also

 White Mountain art

References

External links
 
 New Hampshire Economic and Labor Market Information Bureau Profile

Towns in Coös County, New Hampshire
Berlin, New Hampshire micropolitan area
Towns in New Hampshire